Here is a list of songs by South Korean three-member boy band JYJ (formerly known as Junsu/Jejung/Yuchun in Japan). Formed in 2010, it consists by Jaejoong, Yoochun and Junsu, who are former founding members of SM Entertainment five-member boyband TVXQ.

0-9

A

B

C

D

E

F

G

I

J

L

M

N

O

P

S

T

V

W

Y

See also
List of songs recorded by TVXQ

References

External links
 
 

JYJ
JYJ